The Ministry of Parliamentary Affairs , wazarat-e- parlimani umoor  (abbreviated as MoPA) is a ministry of the Government of Pakistan.

It is tasked with handling affairs relating to the Parliament of Pakistan, and works as a link between the two chambers, the National Assembly (the lower house) and the Senate (the upper house).

See also 
 Parliament of Pakistan
 National Assembly of Pakistan
 Senate of Pakistan
 Federal Government Ministries of Pakistan

References

External links
 Official Site

Parliamentary Affairs
Parliament of Pakistan
Parliamentary affairs ministries